Tommaso d'Aquino, C.R. (1635 – 26 September 1705) was a Roman Catholic prelate who served as Bishop of Sessa Aurunca (1670–1705).

Biography
Tommaso d'Aquino was born in Somma, Italy in 1635 and ordained a priest in the Congregation of Clerics Regular of the Divine Providence. On 30 June 1670, he was appointed during the papacy of Pope Clement X as Bishop of Sessa Aurunca. On 20 July 1670, he was consecrated bishop by Francesco Barberini, Cardinal-Bishop of Ostia e Velletri. He served as Bishop of Sessa Aurunca until his death on 26 September 1705.

Episcopal succession
While bishop, d'Aquino was the principal co-consecrator of:
Pietro Isimbardi, Bishop of Cremona (1670);
Carlo Loffredo, Bishop of Molfetta (1670); and
Francesco Arrigua, Bishop of Nicotera (1670).

References

17th-century Italian Roman Catholic bishops
18th-century Italian Roman Catholic bishops
Bishops appointed by Pope Clement X
1635 births
1705 deaths
Theatine bishops